Tepetitán is a municipality in the San Vicente department of El Salvador.

On February 16, 1833 indio rebel leader Anastasio Aquino was proclaimed commander-in-chief of the liberation army, and issued the Declaration of Tepetitán.

References 

Municipalities of the San Vicente Department